Acanthorhina is an extinct genus of chimaera from the Toarcian age of the Jurassic period. It currently contains a single species, A. jaekeli known from the Posidonia shale of Holzmaden, Germany.

References

Chimaeriformes
Prehistoric chordate genera